Dr. Jekyll and Sister Hyde is a 1971 British horror film directed by Roy Ward Baker based on the 1886 novella Strange Case of Dr Jekyll and Mr Hyde by Robert Louis Stevenson. The film was made by British studio Hammer Film Productions and was their third adaptation of the story after The Ugly Duckling and The Two Faces of Dr. Jekyll. The film is notable for showing Jekyll transform into a female Hyde; it also incorporates into the plot aspects of the historical Jack the Ripper and Burke and Hare cases. The title characters were played by the film's stars, Ralph Bates and Martine Beswick.

Plot
Dr. Henry Jekyll dedicates his life to the curing of all known illnesses; however, his lecherous friend Professor Robertson remarks that Jekyll's experiments take so long to actually be discovered, he will no doubt be dead by the time he is able to achieve anything. Haunted by this remark, Jekyll abandons his studies and obsessively begins searching for an elixir of life, using female hormones taken from fresh cadavers supplied by murderers Burke and Hare, reasoning that these hormones will help him to extend his life since women traditionally live longer than men and have stronger systems. 

In the apartment above Jekyll's lives a family: an elderly mother, her daughter Susan Spencer, and Susan's brother Howard. Susan is attracted to Jekyll, and he returns her affections, but is too obsessed with his work to make advances. Mixing the female hormones into a serum and drinking it not only has the effect of changing Jekyll's character (for the worse) but also of changing his sex, transforming him into a beautiful but evil woman. 

Susan becomes jealous when she discovers this mysterious woman, but when she confronts Jekyll, to explain the sudden appearance of his female alter ego, he calls her Mrs. Edwina Hyde, saying she is his widowed sister who has come to live with him. Howard, on the other hand, develops a lust for Mrs. Hyde.

Jekyll soon finds that his serum requires a regular supply of female hormones to maintain its effect, necessitating the killing of young girls. Burke and Hare supply his needs, but their criminal activities are uncovered. Burke is lynched by a mob and Hare blinded by lime. The doctor decides to take matters into his own hands and commits the murders attributed to Jack the Ripper. Jekyll abhors this, but Mrs. Hyde relishes the killings as she begins to take control, even seducing and then killing Professor Robertson when he attempts to question her about the murders.

As Mrs. Hyde grows more powerful, the two personalities begin to struggle for dominance. Jekyll asks Susan to the opera; however, when he is getting dressed to go out, he unconsciously takes Mrs. Hyde's gown from the wardrobe instead of his own clothes, realizing that he no longer needs to drink the serum in order to transform. 

Susan is heartbroken when Jekyll fails to take her out to the opera, and she decides to go alone. However, the evil Mrs. Hyde decides that innocent, pure Susan's blood is just what she needs to finally take over Jekyll's body. She stalks Susan through the dark streets, but Jekyll's will only just manages to thwart Mrs. Hyde's attempt to kill Susan. He then commits one last murder to find a way to stabilize his condition, but he is interrupted by the police after a comment by Hare leads them to realize the similarity between Jekyll's earlier experiments on cadavers and the Ripper murders. As Jekyll tries to escape by climbing along the outside of a building, he transforms into Mrs. Hyde who, lacking his strength, falls to the ground — dying as a twisted amalgamation of both male and female.

Cast

Critical reception 

Time Out called the film "enormous fun" and an "admirably successful attempt to ring new changes on an old theme". George R. Reis from DVD Drive-In gave the film a positive review, writing, "In the hands of most filmmakers of the time, such a gender-bending theme would call for maximum exploitation tactics, but not with Hammer. Clemens' script doesn't take itself too seriously, yet justly fuses the legends of Stevenson's titular character with Jack the Ripper and the graverobbers Burke and Hare". Reis commended the film's performances and Baker's direction. Variety called the film "highly imaginative", further writing, "Director Roy Ward Baker has set a good pace, built tension nicely and played it straight so that all seems credible. He tops chills and gruesome murders with quite a lot of subtle fun. Bates and Beswick, strong, attractive personalities, bear a strange resemblance to each other making the transitions entirely believable." John Higgins of Starburst Magazine awarded the film 8/10 stars, praising Beswick's performance and the script.

Accolades

Home media
The film was first released on DVD in 2001 by Anchor Bay as part of The Hammer Collection in the U.S. and has since been released on DVD in other territories. The film was released on Blu-ray in 2018.

References

External links 
 
 
 
 

1971 films
1971 horror films
1970s science fiction horror films
British science fiction horror films
1970s English-language films
Dr. Jekyll and Mr. Hyde films
Films shot at EMI-Elstree Studios
Films directed by Roy Ward Baker
Films set in the Victorian era
Films set in London
Cultural depictions of William Burke and Hare
Films about Jack the Ripper
Grave-robbing in film
Hammer Film Productions horror films
American International Pictures films
1970s British films
LGBT-related controversies in film
Casting controversies in film
Film controversies in the United Kingdom